"The Trouble with Girls" is a song written by Chris Tompkins and Philip White, and recorded by American country music artist and American Idol 's season 10 winner, Scotty McCreery. It was released in August 2011 as the second single from his debut album Clear as Day.

Critical reception
Billy Dukes of Taste of Country gave the song mixed reviews, saying that the "heavy-handed production almost sabotages a fine performance." He later said "vulnerable and memorable." He gave the song three stars out of five. Matt Bjorke of Roughstock gave it favorable reviews noting "you’ll be hearing this song quite a bit on your local country radio stations as it’s everything that “I Love You This Big” isn’t and proves that America got it right by voting Scotty as the next American Idol last spring." He gave the song four stars out of five.

Commercial performance
As of February 18, 2014, the song has sold 836,000 copies in the United States. It was certified Platinum by the RIAA on November 11, 2014.

Music video
Directed by Roman White, the video depicts a school day in the life of McCreery, with him performing the song on the baseball field, and in the school hallway. His future wife, Gabi Dugal, is featured as the lead girl in the video. It was filmed at McCreery's alma mater, Garner Magnet High School, in his hometown of Garner, North Carolina.

Charts

Year-end charts

Certifications

Release history

References

2011 songs
2011 singles
Scotty McCreery songs
Mercury Nashville singles
Country ballads
Songs written by Chris Tompkins
Music videos directed by Roman White
Song recordings produced by Mark Bright (record producer)
19 Recordings singles